Farnborough is a village and civil parish in the Stratford-on-Avon district of Warwickshire, England. It is located on the border with Oxfordshire, around 6 miles (10 km) north of Banbury. The population taken at the 2011 census was 265. The village has a church, St Botolphs, a village hall and an eating house, The Kitchen. On the southern edge of the village is Farnborough Hall, a Grade I Listed building built by the Holbech family in the early 17th century and endowed to the National Trust in the 1960s. The interior of the Hall is most famous for its collection of Roman busts and paintings by Canaletto and Giovanni Paolo Panini collected during a Grand Tour by William Holbech junior in the early 18th century.

References

Warwickshire Towns & Villages, by Geoff Allen (2000)

External links
 Farnborough Village website

Villages in Warwickshire